The Terengganu State Road or Jalan Penarik–Mangkuk is a major road to Kampung Mangkuk in Terengganu, Malaysia. Kilometre zero is at Kampung Penarik.

Junction list

Roads in Terengganu